HMS Hannibal was a 14 gun sloop built in 1782, the second ship to bear the name Hannibal.  She foundered in 1788, after only six years in service.

References

Sloops of the Royal Navy
1782 ships